Edward McGuire may refer to:

 Eddie McGuire (born 1964), Australian television personality
 Edward McGuire (painter) (1932–1986), Irish artist
 Edward McGuire (composer) (born 1948), British composer
 Edward McGuire (politician) (1901–1992), Irish politician and tennis player
 E. J. McGuire (Edward John McGuire, 1952–2011), ice hockey coach
Teddy McGuire, Scottish footballer